Tomb, Iran may refer to:
* Tomb-e Bongeru, Iran
 Tomb-e Gowhar, Iran
 Tomb-e Sat, Iran

See also
Tomb (disambiguation)
Tombu (disambiguation)